Captain William J. Minor (January 27, 1808 – September 18, 1869) was an American planter, slave owner, and banker in the antebellum South. Educated in Philadelphia, he lived at the Concord plantation in Natchez, Mississippi, and served as the second President of the Agricultural Bank. He was the owner of three large sugar plantations in Louisiana and supported the Union during the Civil War for the stability of the sugar trade.

Early life
Minor was born on January 27, 1808, in Natchez, Mississippi. His father was Stephen Minor (1760-1844), a planter and banker, and his mother, Katherine (Lintot) Minor (1770-1844).

Minor was educated in Philadelphia in the 1820s. He learned Latin, French and English with a private tutor. He also "attended lectures in chemistry and philosophy at the University of Pennsylvania."

Antebellum career
Minor owned three sugar cane plantations: the 1,900-acre Waterloo Plantation in Ascension Parish, Louisiana, as well as the 6,000-acre Southdown Plantation and the 1,400-acre Hollywood Plantation in Terrebonne Parish, Louisiana. However, as an absentee plantation owner, he did not live on those plantations.

He hired overseers to make sure the slaves were working on the land. He corresponded via mail with his overseers regularly, sending them precise instructions while living in Natchez himself. Moreover, his sons lived on the plantations part of the time. From 1855 to 1861, his son Stephen lived on the Waterloo Plantation until he joined the Confederate States Army; in 1862, his other son Henry took over. Another son, William, lived at the Southdown Plantation and also managed the Hollywood Plantation.

He served as the second President of the Agricultural Bank in Natchez, Mississippi. He was well connected among the planter elite, and visited planters Duncan F. Kenner (1813–1887) and Henry Doyal as well as the McCollums, the Cages, and the Gibsons. He read De Bow's Review and kept a diary.

Politically, he was a supporter of the Whig Party. He was in favor of tariffs on sugar, which meant more profit for domestic sugar producers like himself.

American Civil War
During the American Civil War of 1861–1865, he supported the Union and opposed secession, as he believed that would be bad for the sugar industry. However, he was arrested by Union forces with his son Henry in Houma in 1862; they were released a week later in New Orleans. Meanwhile, Unionists stole sugar and molasses from his Hollywood and Southdown plantations, under the false pretext that it had been deserted, even though overseers and servants were there.

Minor was on friendly terms with Union Generals Benjamin Butler (1818-1893) and Lorenzo Thomas (1804-1875), whose forces protected Concord (his Adams County, Mississippi, plantation) on September 29, 1863, and on March 10, 1864. Both during and after the war, Minor asked for reparations for the financial losses he had endured due to the theft of commodities by Unionist forces, to no avail. By 1863, he had realized his slaves had become unwilling to work; they also killed hogs and sheep.

Because of General Order No. 12 imposed by Union General Nathaniel P. Banks, he was forced to pay them wages. Slaves, who had gotten used to working "under the threat of punishment," were not motivated by their salaries; as a result, Minor tried to reduce their wages if they failed to work. By 1865, Minor paid one third of the crop profit at the Waterloo Plantation to his slaves. He signed a work contract with his slaves at the Southdown and Hollywood plantations whereby they agreed to work ten hours every day except for Sundays and received specific hourly wages as a result. Moreover, Minor agreed to clothe, feed and house them all.

Minor was a supporter of Abraham Lincoln, whom he called "the most conservative & ablest man in the Washington Government." He deplored his assassination, as he believed Lincoln would have been fair to Southern agriculturalists.

Equestrianism

Minor was interested in horseracing. He corresponded with Cadwallader R. Colden and Sanders D. Bruce (1825-1902) about horses. He served as the Secretary of the Natchez Jockey Club. He visited Jerome Park Racetrack in 1866, while it was under construction.

He was also a regular contributor to The Turf, Field and Farm, an equestrian publication. He sometimes used the pseudonym "Redlander."

Personal life
On August 7, 1829, he married Rebecca Ann (Gustine) Minor (1813-1887), the daughter of James Parker Gustine (1781-1818) and Mary Ann (Duncan) Gustine (1790-1863) of Philadelphia, Pennsylvania. They resided at Concord, his family residence, in Natchez, Mississippi. They had seven sons and one daughter, including John Duncan Minor (1831-1869). A Harvard graduate, he married Catherine Surget, the daughter of planter Francis Surget.

Death
He died of apoplexy on September 18, 1869, at the Southdown Plantation near Houma. He was buried at Concord in Natchez, Mississippi.

His obituary was published in The Turf, Field and Farm. It was republished in The Louisiana Democrat.

References

External links 
 William J. Minor Horse Racing Papers. General Collection, Beinecke Rare Book and Manuscript Library.

1808 births
1869 deaths
People from Natchez, Mississippi
People from Terrebonne Parish, Louisiana
People from Ascension Parish, Louisiana
American bankers
American diarists
American planters
Sugar plantation owners
American slave owners
19th-century diarists